Henry Barraud (16 May 1811 – 17 June 1874) was a British portrait, subject and animal painter.

Early life

Barraud was born in London, one of 17 children of William Francis Barraud (1783–1833), a clerk in the Custom House, and Sophia (née) Hull. His paternal grandfather was Paul Philip Barraud an eminent chronometer maker in Cornhill, and his maternal grandfather, Thomas Hull, a miniature painter. The family was of French Huguenot origin that had come over to England at the time of the revocation of the Edict of Nantes. His elder brother William Barraud became a notable animal painter. Another brother, Edward, also had a talent for art, but did not pursue it professionally.

Like his brother, Henry excelled in painting animals, but his works were chiefly portraits, with horses and dogs, and subject pictures, such as 'The Pope blessing the Animals' (painted in 1842), many of which were executed in conjunction with his brother. He exhibited at the Royal Academy from 1833 to 1859, and at the British Institution and Society of British Artists between the years 1831 and 1868. The two brothers shared a studio from 1835 until William's death in 1850, and in their joint pictures William painted the animals and Henry the figures. They also produced a book entitled "Sketches of Figures and Animals", (H. Graves and Co., c.1850).

Works
Barraud's most popular works were: "We praise Thee, O God"; "The London Season, a scene in Hyde Park"; "Lord's Cricket Ground"; and "The Lobby of the House of Commons" (painted in 1872), all of which were engraved or autotyped. He was also commissioned to paint several royal portraits.

Death
Barraud died at his home in Gloucester Place, London on 17 June 1874, in his sixty-fourth year.

Personal life
His son Francis Barraud (1856–1924) was also an artist—best remembered for his painting of "Nipper" the dog on the "His Master's Voice" record label. Another son Herbert Rose Barraud (1845 – c1896) was a noted portrait photographer.

References

External links
Henry Barraud (Freemanart consultancy)
Works by Henry Barraud (Encore editions)
Cotherstone with Mr J. Bowes (Oil on canvas - Royal Collection)

1812 births
1874 deaths
19th-century English painters
English male painters
English portrait painters
Animal artists
19th-century English male artists